Lifeline Malawi is a registered Canadian humanitarian medical relief and development organization. In 2001, Dr. Chris Brooks established the first medical outreach clinic in the community of Ngdozi, approximately 1000 km from the capital city of Lilongwe, on land that was donated by the community. The organization follows a community-based medical clinic delivery model to provide primary health care services, maternity programs, HIV/AIDS counseling, testing and ARV treatment; family planning, and immunizations for children to the local community. Lifeline Malawi also partners with the local district health program for sanitation and communicable disease control.

In 2013, founder Dr. Chris Brooks received the Diamond Jubilee Medal.

References

External links
 Official Website

Health charities in Canada
Medical and health organizations based in British Columbia
Surrey, British Columbia
Foreign charities operating in Malawi